Foo Lake is a 4 acre lake in the Chequamegon National Forest in Sawyer County, Wisconsin.  According to the Wisconsin Department of Natural Resources it contains no sport fish.  It is a lake formed by seepage from the surrounding swamp and the bottom is muck.

References

Lakes of Sawyer County, Wisconsin